Shelley Rhead-Skarvan (born 16 February 1965) is a Canadian speed skater. She competed at the 1988 Winter Olympics and the 1992 Winter Olympics.

References

External links
 

1965 births
Living people
Canadian female speed skaters
Olympic speed skaters of Canada
Speed skaters at the 1988 Winter Olympics
Speed skaters at the 1992 Winter Olympics
Sportspeople from Moose Jaw
20th-century Canadian women